Star Rock is a pillar in Greene County, New York. It is located in the Catskill Mountains north of Tannersville. Parker Mountain is located west-southwest of Star Rock.

References

Mountains of Greene County, New York
Mountains of New York (state)